In Australian Aboriginal mythology (specifically Bundjalung), Dirawong is a goanna Ancestral Being who taught humans how to live on the land, as well as important ceremonies and rituals. Dirawong is known as a benevolent protector of its people from the Rainbow Serpent. Dirawong's gender is ambiguous.

Dirawong and the Rainbow Serpent together created parts of the Richmond River, Goanna Headland, Snake Island, and Pelican Island. In Aboriginal mythology, a deposit of red ochre on top of Goanna Headland is believed to have originates from the wound where the Rainbow Serpent bit Dirawong during the Dreaming.

Dirawong is also believed to have been transformed into, and still resides within, the Goanna Headland.

Dirawong is associated with rain, and there is a rain cave on Goanna Headland where the elders of the Bundjalung people went to in the past to organise ceremonies for rain. Dirawong is also associated with birds and snakes.

Dirawong and the Rainbow Serpent
Bundjalung oral literature tells of a fight between Dirawong and the Rainbow Serpent, which created the Bungawalbin River, the Evans River, Pelican Island, Snake Island, other islands in the Evans River, and also an island at an unknown geographic location in the Pacific Ocean.

According to the legend, the Rainbow Snake had been very bad. What he did is secret knowledge. A weeum ("cleverman", "man of high degree of initiation" or "man with great powers") named Nyimbunji from the area known as Bungawalbin called on Dirawong to help protect a yabbra (bird) from the Rainbow Serpent.

Dirawong chased the Rainbow Serpent from inland eastward towards the coast and as they went they formed parts of the Richmond River. At Maniworkan (or the town of Woodburn, New South Wales) they left the Richmond River and kept on going east. Halfway down the Evans River, Dirawong caught Rainbow Serpent. The Serpent turned around and bit Dirawong on the head. Dirawong then withdrew from the battle in order to eat some herbs to recover from the snakebite.

Meanwhile, Rainbow Serpent had reached Evans Head. Dirawong was nowhere to be seen, so Rainbow Serpent decided to go back west. He then went into the Evans River and coiled himself around and created Snake Island. As he turned, his body made a larger island in the river, now known as Pelican Island.

When Rainbow Serpent spotted Dirawong heading towards him, he quickly turned, and this time he kept going until he reached Burraga (the Tasman Sea), and transformed himself into an island so Dirawong would not recognise him.

Dirawong reached the coast at Evans Head. Dirawong then laid down next to the coast, facing the Burraga, waiting for Rainbow Serpent to come back. A deposit of red ochre at Goanna Headland originates from the wound where the Rainbow Serpent bit Dirawong.

See also 
 List of Australian Aboriginal mythological figures
 Dirawong Reserve

References

Australian Aboriginal legendary creatures
Creator deities
Legendary reptiles